Cape Temnyy (Russian: Mys Temnyy) is a headland in Khabarovsk Krai, Russia.

Geography

The cape is on the eastern side of Tugur Bay, 12 km (about 8 mi) southwest of Cape Bersen'yeva. It consists of seaward-facing, dark cliffs and two conspicuous hills that rise straight up from the coast. It rises to a height of 165 m (541 ft).

History 

American whaleships cruising for bowhead whales frequented the waters off the cape from the 1850s to the 1880s. They called it the Two Sisters. Boat crews also camped near the cape.

References

Temnyy